Sunius is a genus of rove beetles in the family Staphylinidae. There are more than 60 described species in Sunius.

Species
These 65 species belong to the genus Sunius:

 Caloderma angulatum Casey, 1886
 Caloderma continens Casey, 1886
 Caloderma contractum Casey, 1886
 Caloderma mobile Casey, 1886
 Caloderma reductum Casey, 1886
 Caloderma rugosum Casey, 1886
 Caloderma tantillum Casey, 1886
 Sunius aculeatus Assing, 2005
 Sunius adanensis (Lokay, 1918)
 Sunius akdaghensis Anlaş, 2016
 Sunius algiricus (Coiffait, 1969)
 Sunius amanensis Assing, 2005
 Sunius anophthalmus Hernandez & Garcia, 1992
 Sunius balkarensis Assing, 2001
 Sunius bicolor (Olivier, 1795)
 Sunius bozdaghensis Assing, 2006
 Sunius brachypterus (Gemminger & Harold, 1868)
 Sunius brevipennis (Wollaston, 1864)
 Sunius brevispinosus Assing, 2005
 Sunius cagatayi Anlaş, 2016
 Sunius canariensis (Bernhauer, 1928)
 Sunius catalonicus (Coiffait, 1961)
 Sunius ciceki Anlaş, 2016
 Sunius concurvatus Assing, 2017
 Sunius confluentus (Say, 1834)
 Sunius confusus (Coiffait, 1969)
 Sunius debilicornis (Wollaston, 1857)
 Sunius dimidiatus Wollaston, 1864
 Sunius fallax (Lokay, 1919)
 Sunius fenderi Hatch
 Sunius fernandezi Hernandez & Garcia, 1992
 Sunius ferrugineus (Bierig, 1934)
 Sunius filum Aubé, 1850
 Sunius fortespinosus Assing, 2006
 Sunius golgeliensis
 Sunius hellenicus (Coiffait, 1961)
 Sunius italicus (Coiffait, 1961)
 Sunius kizilcadagicus
 Sunius lebedevi (Roubal, 1926)
 Sunius mallorcensis (Coiffait, 1969)
 Sunius melanocephalus (Fabricius, 1792)
 Sunius microphthalmus (H.Franz, 1979)
 Sunius monstrosus LeConte, 1863
 Sunius nevadensis (Coiffait, 1969)
 Sunius nitens (Duvivier, 1883)
 Sunius ovaliceps (Fauvel, 1878)
 Sunius ozgeni Anlaş, 2016
 Sunius palmi (H.Franz, 1979)
 Sunius peregrinus (Casey, 1905)
 Sunius plasoni Eppelsheim, 1875
 Sunius propinquus (Brisout, 1867)
 Sunius puglianus (Coiffait, 1961)
 Sunius quadripennis (Casey, 1905)
 Sunius reuteri Assing, 2017
 Sunius rufipes
 Sunius rugithorax Hatch, 1957
 Sunius seminiger (Fairmaire, 1860)
 Sunius sexpinosus Assing, 2006
 Sunius simoni (Quedenfeldt, 1881)
 Sunius tenerifensis (H.Franz, 1979)
 Sunius unicolor Mulsant & Rey, 1878
 Sunius valentianus (Coiffait, 1980)
 Sunius yagmuri
 Sunius yamani Anlaş, 2018
 † Sunius demersus von Heyden & von Heyden, 1866

References

Further reading

External links

 

Paederinae
Articles created by Qbugbot